Self Explanatory is the debut studio album by American rapper I-20. It was released on October 5, 2004 via Disturbing tha Peace/Capitol Records. Production was handled by Salaam Remi, Groove Junkeys, the Heatmakerz, Craig Love, DJ Paul, Hot Runner, Joe Traxx, Juicy J, Lil' Jon, Red Spyda and Ski. It features guest appearances from Butch Cassidy, Ludacris, 2 Chainz, Bone Crusher, Chingy, Devin the Dude, Juvenile, Lil' Fate, Shawnna and Three 6 Mafia. The album peaked at number 42 on the U.S. Billboard 200 and at #5 on the Top R&B/Hip-Hop Albums chart.

Its lead single "Break Bread" was released on July 13, 2004. Two songs from the album, "Fightin' in the Club" and "Hennessey & Hydro" were released as promotional singles in 2003 and 2004 respectively.

Track listing

Sample credits
 Track #4 sampled Yvonne Fair's "Let Your Hair Down"
 Track #7 sampled The Dramatics' "In the Rain"
 Track #8 sampled Teddy Pendergrass's "Let Me Love You"
 Track #9 sampled Run-DMC's "Darryl & Joe"

Charts

References

External links

2004 debut albums
Capitol Records albums
Albums produced by DJ Paul
Albums produced by Juicy J
Albums produced by Lil Jon
Disturbing tha Peace albums
Albums produced by Salaam Remi
Albums produced by the Heatmakerz
Hip hop albums by American artists
Albums produced by Ski Beatz